Atle Maurud (born 15 October 1970) is a retired Norwegian football striker.

He hails from Gjøvik, and played for Gjøvik SK and SK Gjøvik-Lyn before joining Hamarkameratene ahead of the 1994 season. He only played two Norwegian Premier League games in 1994, but then established himself in the first team. In the 1997 season he played for SFK Lyn. He played regularly, but the team was relegated and he returned to Hamarkameratene. The team experienced a series of relegations to the Second Division, but was back in the First Division for the 2000 season. He stayed here until 2001, when he did not get much first-team football and was loaned out to FF Lillehammer. He then played for Raufoss IL and SK Gjøvik-Lyn again.

References

Norwegian footballers
Hamarkameratene players
Lyn Fotball players
Raufoss IL players
Sportspeople from Gjøvik
1970 births
Living people
Eliteserien players
SK Gjøvik-Lyn players

Association football forwards